Joe Boyd (born August 5, 1942) is an American record producer and writer. He formerly owned Hannibal Records. Boyd has worked on recordings of Pink Floyd, Fairport Convention, Sandy Denny, Richard Thompson, Nick Drake, The Incredible String Band, R.E.M., Vashti Bunyan, John and Beverley Martyn, Maria Muldaur, Kate & Anna McGarrigle, Billy Bragg, James Booker, 10,000 Maniacs, and Muzsikás.

Life and career
Boyd was born in Boston, Massachusetts, and raised in Princeton, New Jersey. He attended Pomfret School in Pomfret, Connecticut. He first became involved in music promoting blues artists while a student at Harvard University. After graduating, Boyd  worked as a production and tour manager for music impresario George Wein, which took Boyd to Europe to organise concerts with Muddy Waters, Coleman Hawkins, Stan Getz and Sister Rosetta Tharpe. Boyd was responsible for the sound at the 1965 Newport Folk Festival, when Bob Dylan played a controversial set backed by electric musicians.

In 1964 Boyd moved to London to establish the UK office of Elektra Records. In 1966, Boyd and John "Hoppy" Hopkins opened the UFO Club, a famous but short-lived UK Underground club in London's Tottenham Court Road. He produced the first single "Arnold Layne" by UFO regulars Pink Floyd, and recordings by Soft Machine. Boyd worked extensively with audio engineer John Wood at Sound Techniques studio in Chelsea. In this studio, Boyd and Wood made a succession of celebrated albums  with British folk and folk rock artists, including the Incredible String Band, Martin Carthy, Nick Drake, John Martyn, Fairport Convention and Richard Thompson. Some of these were produced by Boyd's company Witchseason Productions.

Boyd returned to the United States at the end of 1970 to work as a music producer for Warner Bros. with special input into films, where he collaborated with Stanley Kubrick on the sound track release of A Clockwork Orange. Boyd also contributed to the soundtrack of Deliverance, directed by John Boorman, where he supervised the recording of "Dueling Banjos", which became a hit single for Eric Weissberg. Boyd also produced and co-directed the  film documentary Jimi Hendrix (1973). In the States, Boyd produced albums by Maria Muldaur and Kate & Anna McGarrigle. Boyd subsequently founded the Hannibal Records label in 1980 (later absorbed into Rykodisc), which released albums by Richard Thompson and many recordings of world music, including Hungarian band Muzsikás. Boyd also produced R.E.M.'s third album Fables of the Reconstruction (1985) and records by Billy Bragg and 10,000 Maniacs.

Boyd was executive producer for the 1989 feature film Scandal, starring John Hurt and Bridget Fonda about the Profumo affair in UK politics in 1963. Boyd left Hannibal/Ryko in 2001 and his autobiography, White Bicycles - Making Music in the 1960s, was published in 2006 by Serpent's Tail in the UK.

In 2008, Boyd was a judge for the 7th annual Independent Music Awards to support independent artists.

Boyd was a producer on the long-delayed Aretha Franklin concert film "Amazing Grace."

Records produced or co-produced

References

Further reading
 Boyd, Joe, White Bicycles - Making Music in the 1960s, Serpent's Tail. 2006. 
 Joe Beard's biography of The Purple Gang – Taking the Purple –

External links
Joe Boyd Official Website
Joe Boyd interviewed on The Current
PUNKCAST#1129 Video of 'White Bicycles' reading in NYC, Mar 28 2007. (RealPlayer, mp4)
2011 Interview about White Bicycles, Hannibal Records, and live show with Robyn Hitchcock

1942 births
Living people
Harvard University alumni
Businesspeople from Boston
American music industry executives
American expatriates in England
Pomfret School alumni
Record producers from Massachusetts